List of the Mayors of Duluth, Minnesota.

‡ = second time in office

Duluth, Minnesota
Duluth